Selasi Adjei (born 12 November 1993) is a Ghanaian footballer who is currently a free agent after ending his contract with Zambian club Nakambala Leopards.

Club career

Early career
Adjei began at Aflao Hearts Babie in 2002, Windy Professional FC in 2009.

Professional
Adjei began his professional football career with King Faisal 2009, Hearts of Lions FC in 2011, Amidaus Professionals in 2012 and scored 10 league goals in 9 matches the first round of the 2012–2013 season, and in the 2013–14 season it was announced that Adeji had signed a one-year deal with Ghanaian side Hearts of Oak.

On 7 June 2017, Adjei left Hearts of Oak SC and signed with MTN/FAZ Super Division side Nakambala Leopards.

Position
Adjei can play as Attacker.

References

External links
 

1993 births
Living people
Ghanaian footballers
Ghanaian expatriate footballers
Association football forwards
King Faisal Babes FC players
Heart of Lions F.C. players
Accra Hearts of Oak S.C. players
Ghana Premier League players
Expatriate footballers in Zambia
Ghanaian expatriate sportspeople in Zambia
People from Volta Region